The 2018–19 season was the 28th season of competitive association football in Ukraine since dissolution of the Soviet Union.

National teams

Ukraine national football team

Results and fixtures

Ukraine U-21 national football team

Ukraine U-19 national football team

Ukraine women's national football team

Results and fixtures

Ukraine women's national student football team

UEFA competitions

UEFA Champions League

Qualifying phase and play-off round

Third qualifying round

|}

Play-off round

|}

Group stage

Group F

UEFA Europa League

Qualifying phase and play-off round

Second qualifying round 

|}

Third qualifying round 

|}

Play-off round

|}

Group stage

Group E

Group K

Knockout phase

Round of 32

|}

Round of 16

|}

UEFA Youth League

UEFA Champions League Path

Group F

UEFA Women's Champions League

Men's club football

Note: For all scratched clubs, see section Clubs removed for more details

Premier League

League 1

League 2

Cup competitions

Ukrainian Cup

Super Cup

Women's club football

Note: For all scratched clubs, see section Clubs removed for more details

Higher League

Managerial changes 
This is a list of managerial changes among Ukrainian professional football clubs (top two leagues):

Clubs removed

Before the season
 Stal Kamianske, 12th place of the 2017–18 Ukrainian Premier League, was originally relegated, but later withdraw from the First League. The same day the PFL president confirmed that the league will consist of 16 teams. Originally, FC Stal Kamianske that were located in Kamianske played its games of the 2017–18 Ukrainian Premier League season in Kyiv. After relegation the club was admitted to the First League representing Bucha, Kyiv Oblast. Prior to the season commencing the club was renamed to FC Feniks Bucha.
 Naftovyk-Ukrnafta Okhtyrka, the Professional Football League allowed the club to keep its berth in the second tier even after its main sponsor announced that it will discontinue to fund the club. After the season completed, Ukrnafta (related to the Privat Group) who sponsored Naftovyk-Ukrnafta Okhtyrka decided to liquidate the club since it was a tax liability.
 Zhemchuzhyna Odesa withdrew after Round 31 during 2017–18 season. Technical losses were adjudged against the team in the last three matches. At time of withdrawal, Zhemchuzhyna's had played 31 matches, with a record of 7 wins, 6 draws and 18 losses, scoring 33 goals and having conceded 54 goals.
 Arsenal-Kyivshchyna Bila Tserkva failed attestation for the season and was removed from the league
 FC Ternopil after failing to arrive for their Round 6 away match against Polissya Zhytomyr, several days later informed the PFL that they are withdrawing from the competition. The club played four matches in the competition with a record of 4 losses scoring two goals and allowing nine goals scored against them. The PFL annulled their results as per league regulations and removed them from the official standings on the decision of the FFU Control and Disciplinary Committee of 7 September 2017.
 FC Metalurh Zaporizhzhia – prior to attestation, the club merged with FC Spartak-KPU Zaporizhzhia (a team of local university, KPU), but on 6 June 2018, the club failed attestation for the season and the club's administration decided to dissolve the team
 Inhulets-2 Petrove – the main club's administration of Inhulets Petrove decided to dissolve the second team
 Sudnobudivnyk Mykolaiv – failed attestation
 Skala Stryi – passed attestation, but dissolved its senior team protesting the FFU accusations in gambling. On 14 June 2018, there appeared information that the club will merge its academy with FC Volyn Lutsk.

During or after the season
 Arsenal–Kyiv withdrew from professional competitions after being relegated from the Premier League.
 PFC Sumy received new ownership during winter break in the face of Serhiy Vashchenko who earlier this season was supposed to become the owner of Kobra Kharkiv. The new head coach of the Sumy club who had been announced was also former head coach of Kobra, Oleksandr Oliynyk. At the same time according to the former club's director Anatoliy Boiko, on 1 December 2018 PFC Sumy did not have any players on contract. On 11 April 2019, the FFU Control and Disciplinary Committee adopted its decision to strip the club of professional status and exclude the club from any competitions that it is participating currently or in the future. However the club has a right to file an appeal. Additional separate sanctions were to be also applied against the club's playing and administrative personnel. On 14 April 2019, the chairman of the FFU committee of ethics and fair play Francesco Baranka noted in regards to additional sanctions that PFC Sumy has earned some 10 million euros in match fixing. More to it, Ukrainian coach Oleksandr Sevidov who held post of head coach consultant in PFC Sumy and previously managed FC Illichivets Mariupol received a lifetime disqualification.
 On 17 February 2019, president of FC Zirka Kropyvnytskyi commented on his club's withdrawal from further participation in competitions of the Ukrainian First League. The president accused the newly formed NABU and law enforcement authorities in pressure against him. The president of the league expressed his surprise claiming that there seemed no real reason why the club had to withdraw. On 5 April 2019, the PFL council of leagues adopted its decision to remove FC Zirka Kropyvnytskyi from the League as it officially withdrew on 14 March 2019. On 22 April 2019, the club's vice-president announced that the club will restart from regional competitions with intention to return the club's pro-status in the future.
 Helios Kharkiv, the club reorganized under new management under a new name as FC Kobra Kharkiv. The club merged with another amateur club called the Kobra Football Academy which was playing in the Kharkiv Oblast Football Championship. On 15 August 2018 the club informed the Professional Football League of Ukraine about withdrawal from professional competitions, and were later officially expelled from the league.
 FC Myr Hornostayivka withdrew from competitions in protest.
 Zlahoda-Dnipro-1 
 WFC Lviv

Notes

References

 
Seasons in Ukrainian football
2019 sport-related lists
2018 sport-related lists